is a Khmer term literally meaning "ancient Cambodian martial arts techniques". It consists of 12 core techniques and 8 "door systems" or footwork patterns. Usually, students learn from different masters who specialize in different weapons or areas of expertise.

See also
Banshay
Bokator
Khmer traditional wrestling
Krabi-krabong
Pradal serey
Silambam

References

"Cambodian Bloodsport". Human Weapon. Bill Duff, Jason Chambers. History Channel.16 November 2007.
"Angkorian Warrior Article"
"About Kun Khmer - 12 Maes, 8 Door System, and Weapons"
"Official Website of Yuthakun Khöm Association"

Cambodian martial arts